Cylin Busby is an author and screenwriter, known for the best-selling true crime memoir, The Year We Disappeared, written with her father John Busby.

Early life
Born the youngest of three children (she has two older brothers, Eric Busby and Shawn Busby), Cylin grew up in Falmouth on Cape Cod, Massachusetts. In 1979, her police officer father, John Busby, was seriously injured in a shooting. During the resulting investigation, the family was relocated and lived in hiding for five years. Cylin and John co-wrote a memoir about the experience which went on to become a best seller, placing at #3 on the nonfiction lists for The Wall Street Journal and Publishers Weekly.  The book also earned #1 best seller placement on Amazon's nonfiction list. Their memoir was featured in 2009 on the CBS television program 48 Hours in an episode titled Live to Tell: The Year We Disappeared and was optioned for a motion picture in 2014.

Education and career
Cylin graduated from Hampshire College (B.A.). Her publishing career began at Random House. She would later work at HarperCollins and Simon & Schuster as a children's book editor. In 2000, she relocated to Los Angeles where she began working as the Senior Editor of Teen Magazine. She has written more than 20 books for young readers and is published in 15 countries.

Personal
Cylin lives in Los Angeles with her family. Her latest novel is the YA thriller, The Stranger Game. HarperCollins announced the publication of her next picture book, The White House Cat, for January 2022.

Awards and recognition
For The Year We Disappeared
 Publishers Weekly Best Book of 2008
 An IndieBound Next Pick
 Cybils Award, Nonfiction, 2008
 Georgia Peach Book Award For Teen Readers Nominee
 IRA/CC Young Adults’ Choice
 Texas Taysha Reading List (2010)
 Iowa High School Book Award (2011)
For Blink Once
 Junior Library Guild Selection
 Scholastic Catalog Selection
 Nominated and Finalist: Isinglass Book Award, 2014
 Nominated and Finalist: Grand Canyon Reader Award, 2014
 Published in: US, United Kingdom, Australia, New Zealand, Czech Republic, Germany.
For The Nine Lives of Jacob Tibbs
 Starred review, Booklist
 Starred review, School Library Journal
 Amazon "Best Book of the Month" February 2016
For The Stranger Game
 Junior Library Guild Selection
 Rights sold in: US, United Kingdom, Turkey, Spain, France

Works

Fiction
 The Chicken Fried Rat (1999)
 Blink Once (2012)
 The Nine Lives of Jacob Tibbs (2016)
 The Stranger Game (2016)

Nonfiction
 Getting Dumped…and Getting Over It (2001)
 Pajama Party Undercover (2003)
 Dream Journey (2003)

Picture Book
 The Bookstore Cat (2020) Illustrations by Charles Santoso 
 The White House Cat (2022) Illustrations by Neely Daggett

Memoir
 The Year We Disappeared: A Father-Daughter Memoir, John and Cylin Busby (2008).

Series
 Date Him or Dump Him? (2007)
 The Campfire Crush
 The Dance Dilemma
 Ski Trip Trouble

Anthology
 First Kiss, Then Tell (2008)

Short Story
 The Homestake Project (2020) The Magazine of Fantasy and Science Fiction

Audio book
 The Year We Disappeared, John and Cylin Busby, (2012)
 The Stranger Game (2016)

Film and television
 48 Hours "Live to Tell: The Year We Disappeared" (airdate: 2/14/09)
 Optioned: The Year We Disappeared (limited series)
 In development: The Stranger Game (TV series)
Screenplay: Rebecca and Quinn Get Scared (with Nanci Katz)
 Sold to New Line Cinema. Trish Sie attached to direct. Donald DeLine producing.
 Austin Film Festival Finalist (Comedy), Semifinalist (Horror), 2017 
 Script Pipeline Screenplay competition, 2017
 BlueCat Screenplay competition, 2017
Screenplay: Extremophile (sci-fi/horror)
 Finalist, The Writers Lab, 2022.
 Based on short story, The Homestake Project
Screenplay: A Tale of Two Christmases (written with Nanci Katz) (Crown Media/Hallmark)
 2022 (premiere 11/26/22 on Peacock+ and Hallmark Channel)
Screenplay: Weekend to Die For (written with Nanci Katz) 
 2023

References

External links
 
 

Living people
American children's writers
American magazine editors
Hampshire College alumni
Place of birth missing (living people)
Year of birth missing (living people)